Bertacco is an Italian surname.

List of people with the surname 

 Stefano Bertacco (1962–2020), Italian politician
 Valeria Bertacco, American academic

See also 

 Berta Collado

Surnames
Surnames of Italian origin
Italian-language surnames